The Men's time trial of the 2021 UCI Road World Championships was a cycling event that took place on 19 September 2021 in Flanders, Belgium. It was the 28th edition of the championship, for which Filippo Ganna of Italy is the defending champion, having won in 2020. Ganna retained his title after beating Belgian riders Wout van Aert and Remco Evenepoel.

Participating nations
58 cyclists from 39 nations competed in the event. The number of cyclists per nation is shown in parentheses.

 
 
 
 
 
 
 
 
 
 
 
 
 
 
 
 
 
 
 
 
 
 
 
 
 
 
 
 
  Russian Cycling Federation (1)

Final classification

References

Men's time trial
UCI Road World Championships – Men's time trial
2021 in men's road cycling